The African Methodist Episcopal Church in Cumberland, Allegany County, Maryland, was built in 1892 to replace a previous church which the congregation had outgrown.  The congregation was founded  in 1847 by a group of African-American Methodists who had previously worshiped from the balcony of the Centre Street Methodist Episcopal Church. The first church was built in 1848, then rebuilt and enlarged in 1871 and again in 1875.

The church follows Methodist practice by placing Sunday school and meeting space on the street level, with the sanctuary above.

It was listed on the National Register of Historic Places in 1979.

See also
African Methodist Episcopal Church

References

External links
, including 2002 photo, at Maryland Historical Trust

African-American history in Appalachia
Churches on the National Register of Historic Places in Maryland
Churches completed in 1892
19th-century Methodist church buildings in the United States
Churches in Allegany County, Maryland
Buildings and structures in Cumberland, Maryland
African Methodist Episcopal churches in Maryland
National Register of Historic Places in Allegany County, Maryland
1892 establishments in Maryland